Ritápolis National Forest is a national forest in the state of Minas Gerais, Brazil.

Location

It covers parts of the municipalities of São João del Rei, Ritápolis and Coronel Xavier Chaves in Minas Gerais.

Conservation

The Ritápolis National Forest was created on 21 September 1999 and is administered by the Chico Mendes Institute for Biodiversity Conservation (ICMBio).
It is classed as IUCN protected area category VI (protected area with sustainable use of natural resources), with the goal of supporting sustainable multiple use of forest resources and scientific research, with emphasis on methods for sustainable exploitation of native forests.

Notes

Sources

1999 establishments in Brazil
National forests of Brazil
Protected areas of Minas Gerais